Nehru and Bose: Parallel Lives is a non-fiction book written by Indian historian Rudrangshu Mukherjee on the relationship between two Indian nationalist freedom fighters Subhas Chandra Bose and Jawaharlal Nehru, the first prime minister of India. It covers both men's relationship with Gandhi, their activities in the nationalist movement, and their growing disagreements during the 1930s.

The book has been the subject of a positive review by K. A. R. Narasiah writing for The Hindu.

References 

2015 non-fiction books
History books about India
Books about politics of India
Cultural depictions of Subhas Chandra Bose
Cultural depictions of Jawaharlal Nehru
Penguin Books India books